Hell for Certain is an unincorporated community in Leslie County, Kentucky, United States. The place became known as Hell for Certain because it is located near a creek of the same name.

A mission church sits at the mouth of Hell for Certain Creek at the Middle Fork Kentucky River. The church was started in the early 1950s by the late Miss Evelyn Fuqua, who was a licensed minister in the Fellowship of Grace Brethren Churches.

The area has been extensively mined for coal. The Geological Society of America has borrowed "Hell for Certain" as a name for the tonstein located in the area and throughout the Appalachian basin.

The Bluegrass Brewing Company of Louisville named one of their beers after Hell for Certain.

References

External links 
 Hell For Certain — A Carboniferous Volcanic Ash in the Eastern USA , Geological Society abstract, Donald Chestnut.

Unincorporated communities in Leslie County, Kentucky
Unincorporated communities in Kentucky